Dad Zari (also Romanized as Dād Zarī; also known as Dāz Darī) is a village in Dust Mohammad Rural District, in the Central District of Hirmand County, Sistan and Baluchestan Province, Iran. At the 2006 census, its population was 122, in 20 families.

References 

Populated places in Hirmand County